Hartberg is a city in Styria, Austria, the capital of the Hartberg-Fürstenfeld District. As of 2014, it has a population of 6,449 in an area of 21.58 km2. About 68 km up the A2 is the large city of Graz.

This town has a long and rich history. A settlement was located here in the Neolithic ages. One of the most important, prehistoric settlements of Styria developed on "Ringkogel" in the 3rd century BC. A massive protective wall surrounded it. Only two towers remain of the 7-8 metre high and 1500 metre long wall. (Schölbinger Tower and Reck Tower). The first mention of Hartberg as a city was in a 1286 document. During the 15th century it was conquered by King Matthias Corvinus of Hungary. A huge fire destroyed the town up to a few houses, but the population has been continually on the rise since then.

A massive protective wall surrounded it. In 1122 margrave Leopold I of Styria founded "Hartberg". Hartberg was even a central village in Styria for a certain time. The first written reference to Hartberg as "civitas" was in 1286.

References

External links
 the official site of Hartberg

Cities and towns in Hartberg-Fürstenfeld District
March of Styria